Ebone may refer to:

 Ebone, Cameroon, a town and commune in Cameroon
 EBONE, a pan-European Internet backbone